Toku Do is an album by guitarist Larry Coryell which was recorded in 1987 and released on the Muse label.

Reception

The AllMusic review by Scott Yanow stated "Despite the exotic title, this is one of three fairly straight-ahead sets that guitarist Larry Coryell recorded for Muse from 1985-89. ... Excellent playing all around".

Track listing
 "Moment's Notice" (John Coltrane) – 6:03
 "'Round Midnight" (Thelonious Monk, Cootie Williams, Bernie Hanighen) – 8:43	
 "Toku Do" (Buster Williams) – 6:57
 "November Mood" (Stanley Cowell) – 6:03
 "Just Friends" (John Klenner, Sam M. Lewis) – 8:21
 "My Funny Valentine" (Richard Rodgers, Lorenz Hart) – 6:31	
 "Sophisticated Lady" (Duke Ellington, Irving Mills, Mitchell Parish) – 5:02

Personnel
Larry Coryell – guitar
Stanley Cowell – piano 
Buster Williams – bass 
Beaver Harris – drums

References

Muse Records albums
Larry Coryell albums
1988 albums
Albums recorded at Van Gelder Studio